Chimera is a software library created as a research project at UCSB for the C programming language that implements a structured, peer-to-peer routing platform to allow the easy development of peer-to-peer applications.

The project's focus is on providing a fast, lightweight implementation of a system like other prefix-routing protocols such as UCSB's Tapestry system and Microsoft Research's Pastry system, that can be easily used to build an application that creates an overlay network with a limited number of library calls. The library is intended to serve as both a usable complete structured peer-to-peer system and a starting point for further research. It includes some of the current work in locality optimization and soft-state operations.

The system contains both a leaf set of neighbor nodes, which provides fault tolerance and a probabilistic invariant of constant routing progress, and a PRR-style routing table to improve routing time to a logarithmic factor of network size.

Chimera is currently being used in industry labs, as part of research done by the U.S. Department of Defense, and by startup companies.

Notes

References
Chimera documentation by Rama Alebouyeh included with source code

External links
 Chimera at UCSB

Distributed data storage